The Piel CP-20 Pinocchio is a single engine French sport monoplane first flown in 1951. Only two were built but one was still flying over sixty years later.

Design and development
Despite sharing the name Pinocchio, the CP-20 was a completely different design from Claude Piel's first aircraft, the CP-10 Pinocchio. The CP-20 is a conventional low wing cantilever monoplane whereas the CP-10 was a Pou-du-Ciel style tandem wing design; it did inherit the CP-10's rudder, wheels and firewall. The centre section of the Pinocchio's wing is rectangular in plan and the outer panels are semi-elliptical. It has broad-chord ailerons but no flaps.

The fuselage is almost flat sided and bottomed but with raised, rounded decking behind the single seat cockpit and canopy. The empennage is conventional, with  tapered horizontal surfaces mounted near the top of the fuselage and a curved fin carrying a broad, balanced rudder. The rudder extends down to the keel, so the elevators are cut away to allow its movement. The Pinocchio has a wide track tail wheel/skid undercarriage with main wheels on vertical, cantilever legs from the wings.

Only two Pinocchios were built. The first had a  converted Volkswagen  litre engine. The second, built by Pierre Bordini, was originally designated the CP-210 and was powered by a  Salmson 9 AD engine. In July 1961 it became the CP-211, with the same Salmson engine but with a one-piece sliding canopy and more raked screen, faired landing legs and a tailwheel rather than a skid, greater fuel capacity, and a cropped vertical tail. Its time as the CP-211 was brief, for at the end of 1961 it became the CP-212, fitted with a  Continental A-65 air-cooled flat-four engine.

Operational history
In 1951 the CP-20 won the 4th RSA Cup, flown at Montargis. During the 1960s the CP-212 had several owners but its certificate expired in 1970. In the 1990s it was restored and eventually re-registered in October 2001 as the CP-215. It remained on the French civil register in 2014.

Variants
Data from Massé (2004)
CP-20 First airframe, as below.
CP-210 Second airframe with  Salmson 9 ADb radial engine
CP-211 Second airframe, as CP-210 but with one piece, sliding canopy and cropped vertical tail.
CP-212 Second airframe, as CP-211 but with  Continental A65 engine. 
CP-215 Second airframe restored.

Specifications (CP-20)

References

Piel aircraft
1950s French sport aircraft
Homebuilt aircraft
Tandem-wing aircraft
Single-engined tractor aircraft
Aircraft first flown in 1951